Crane Manohar (born 4 October 1965) is an Indian actor who appears in Tamil films, mostly in comedy roles. He appeared in many Vadivelu and Vivek comedy tracks.

Career 
Manohar initially worked as a crane technician for films and when he started acting he kept the name 'Crane' Manohar. He started his career by acting in several K. S. Ravikumar films before playing supporting comedic roles in many films, often with Vadivelu.  He garnered praise from critics for his roles in films including Kannukku Kannaga (2000) and Thenali (2000).

Crane had roles in Udhaya (2004), Veeranna (2005), Satham Podathey (2007), Padikkadavan (2009), Velayudham (2011), Neram (2013), Bramman (2014), Katham Katham (2015) and Kamara Kattu (2015). He debuted as a character artiste in Irandu Manam Vendum (2016). He is also acted in sequel movies like Ko 2 (2016), Singam 3 (2017), Saamy 2 (2018), Charlie Chaplin 2 (2019) and Kazhugu 2 (2019).

Selected filmography

References

External links
 

Living people
21st-century Indian male actors
Male actors in Tamil cinema
Place of birth missing (living people)
Tamil comedians
1965 births
Male actors from Chennai